Attalea osmantha (considered a synonym of the more widespread Attalea butyracea by some authors) is a large pinnately leaved palm found in Trinidad and Tobago and northern Venezuela.

References

osmantha
Trees of Trinidad and Tobago
Trees of Venezuela